R.T. Ramachandran is an Indian politician and  Member of the 15th Legislative Assembly of Tamil Nadu from Kunnam. He was elected to the Tamil Nadu legislative assembly as an All India Anna Dravida Munnetra Kazhagam candidate from Kunnam constituency in 2016 election.

References 

People from Perambalur district
Living people
Year of birth missing (living people)
Tamil Nadu MLAs 2016–2021